Lists of Linyphiidae species cover species of the spider family Linyphiidae. The overall list is divided into alphabetical sub-lists.

Lists
List of Linyphiidae species (A–H)
List of Linyphiidae species (I–P)
List of Linyphiidae species (Q–Z)